A passenger name record is the detail of a passenger's travel held by an airline or transport operator.

PNR may also refer to :

Political parties
 Partido Nacional Renovador, Portugal (so named 2000–2020)
 Partidul Național Român, an ethnic Romanian party of Austria–Hungary (1881–1918) and Romania (1919–1926)
 Partidul Național Român (Moldova) (so named 2000–2013; now New Historical Option)
 Partidul Neamului Românesc or Romanian Nationhood Party (founded 2019)
Partido Nacional Revolucionario, Mexico (so named 1929–1938; now Partido Revolucionario Institucional)

Transport
 Penrith railway station, Cumbria, England (by GBR station code)
 Philippine National Railways, Philippines
 Pioneer MRT station, west Singapore (by MRT station code)
 Pointe Noire Airport, Congo (by IATA code)

Other uses
 Paranormal romance, a subgenre of fiction depicting romantic relationships with supernatural creatures
 Paul North Rice, American librarian
 Photoreceptor cell-specific nuclear receptor
 Point of no return, an idiomatic expression
 Policía Nacional Revolucionaria, Cuba's national police force
 Regional nature parks of France, a type of nature park